Jonathan Jesús Bauman (born 30 March 1991) is an Argentine professional football player who plays as a forward for Ecuadorian Serie A club Barcelona SC.

Career
He debuted in Colon, on October 8, 2009, against Arsenal de Sarandi. In his debut his team thrashed by 4 to 1 to his rival, and he was the assist of one of the goals. His position is forward, although he can also be delayed to midfielder.

In August 2011, it was loaned to a Paraná Board of Trustees for one year, who was a member of the First National B Bank. At the end of the contractual loan, he passes to Deportivo Armenio, club where he remains until the end of 2012.
In January 2013, after negotiating his contractual status with Colón, owner of his pass, he crossed the mountain range to join the Santiago Morning club that played in Chile.
The beginning of the 2013–2014 season finds him with the Gymnastics jersey of Jujuy in the First National B of his native country, where he did not have a good performance.
At the beginning of 2015, he disembarked as a free signing at Instituto de Córdoba, where, despite not having a good goal average, he achieved a good performance being one of the main figures of the rojiblanco team. However, the CD of the institution left him free.
At the beginning of 2016, he returned to the club that saw him born as a footballer, Union de Sunchales.

International career

On November 18, 2009, Bauman, in a meeting with Germán Lerche and Antonio Mohamed, learned that he was summoned by Sergio Batista to work with the Youth Team.
On May 4, 2010, Bauman receives the news that he was chosen by Sergio Batista as one of the 16 players sparring of the Argentina for the 2010 World Cup in South Africa.

Honours

Club 
Unión Sunchales
 Copa Santa Fe : 2016

Kedah
 Malaysia FA Cup: 2019
 Malaysia Cup: runners-up 2019

Independiente del Valle
 Ecuadorian Serie A: 2021
 Copa Sudamericana: 2022

Individual 
 Liga 1 Best Eleven: 2018
 Ecuadorian Serie A Top Goalscorer: 2021

References

External links
 
 

1991 births
Living people
Argentine footballers
Argentine expatriate footballers
Club Atlético Patronato footballers
Club Atlético Colón footballers
Deportivo Armenio footballers
Santiago Morning footballers
Tiro Federal footballers
Instituto footballers
Unión de Sunchales footballers
Guillermo Brown footballers
PAE Kerkyra players
Kedah Darul Aman F.C. players
Persib Bandung players
Arema F.C. players
Quilmes Atlético Club footballers
Mushuc Runa S.C. footballers
C.S.D. Independiente del Valle footballers
Argentine Primera División players
Primera B Metropolitana players
Primera Nacional players
Primera B de Chile players
Liga 1 (Indonesia) players
Malaysia Super League players
Ecuadorian Serie A players
Association football forwards
Argentine expatriate sportspeople in Chile
Argentine expatriate sportspeople in Greece
Argentine expatriate sportspeople in Indonesia
Argentine expatriate sportspeople in Malaysia
Expatriate footballers in Chile
Expatriate footballers in Greece
Expatriate footballers in Indonesia
Expatriate footballers in Malaysia
Expatriate footballers in Ecuador
Argentine people of German descent
Footballers from Santa Fe, Argentina